Ruse Iztok Thermal Power Plant is a power plant situated near the city of Ruse, Bulgaria. It has an installed capacity of 400 MW. It is owned by Holding Slovenske elektrarne.
Ruse Iztok Power Plant has 3 chimneys, from which 2 have a height of 180 metres and 1 has a height of 140 metres.

See also

 Energy in Bulgaria

References

External links 
 http://eea.government.bg/bul/About/RR/R_KPKZ/God_dokladi/topl08.doc

Coal-fired power stations in Bulgaria
Buildings and structures in Ruse Province